Tebah may refer to:

 Bema, an elevated platform used as an orator's podium
 Tebah, Afghanistan